Hexham Abbey is a Grade I listed place of Christian worship dedicated to St Andrew, in the town of Hexham, Northumberland, in the North East of England. Originally built in AD 674, the Abbey was built up during the 12th century into its current form, with additions around the turn of the 20th century. Since the Dissolution of the Monasteries in 1537, the Abbey has been the parish church of Hexham.  In 2014 the Abbey regained ownership of its former monastic buildings, which had been used as Hexham magistrates' court, and subsequently developed them into a permanent exhibition and visitor centre, telling the story of the Abbey's history.

History
There has been a church on the site for over 1300 years since Etheldreda, Queen of Northumbria made a grant of lands to St Wilfrid, Bishop of York c.674 AD. Of Wilfrid's Benedictine abbey, which was constructed almost entirely of material salvaged from nearby Roman ruins, the Saxon crypt still remains; as does a frith stool, a 7th/8th century cathedra or throne. For a little while around that time it was the seat of a bishopric.

In the year 875 Halfdan Ragnarsson the Dane ravaged the whole of Tyneside, and Hexham Church was plundered and burnt to the ground.

About 1050, one Eilaf was put in charge of Hexham, although as treasurer of Durham, he probably never went there. Eilaf was instructed to rebuild Hexham Church, which then lay in utter ruin. His son Eilaf II completed the work, probably building in the Norman style.

In Norman times, Wilfrid's abbey was replaced by an Augustinian priory. The current church largely dates from c.1170–1250, built in the Early English style of architecture. The choir, north and south transepts and the cloisters, where canons studied and meditated, date from this period.

The east end was rebuilt in 1858. The Abbey was largely rebuilt during the incumbency of Canon Edwin Sidney Savage, who came to Hexham in 1898 and remained until 1919. This mammoth project involved re-building the nave, whose walls incorporate some of the earlier church, and the restoration of the choir. The nave was re-consecrated on 8 August 1908.

The church was recorded as Grade I listed in 1951. In 1996 an additional chapel was created at the east end of the north choir aisle; named St Wilfrid's Chapel, which offers a place for prayer or quiet reflection.

Stained glass
Four of the stained glass windows in the Abbey are the work of Jersey-born stained glass artist Henry Thomas Bosdet who was commissioned by the Abbey. The east window was the first project and was installed about 1907. Two smaller windows followed and the large west window was installed in 1918.

Crypt
The crypt is a plain structure of four chambers. Here were exhibited the relics which were a feature of Wilfrid's church. It consists of a chapel with an ante-chapel at the west end, two side passages with enlarged vestibules and three stairways. The chapel and ante-chapel are barrel-vaulted. All the stones used are of Roman workmanship and many are carved or with inscriptions. One inscription on a slab, partially erased, is:

Translated, this means The Emperor Lucius Septimus Severus Pius Pertinax and his sons the Emperor Marcus Aurelius Antoninus Pius Augustus and Publius Geta Caesar the cohorts and detachments made this under the command of  ….. The words erased are of great interest: after the Emperor Geta was murdered by his brother Caracalla, an edict was made at Rome ordering that whenever the two names appeared in combination that of Geta was to be erased. This so-called damnatio memoriae was carried out, but so poorly that the name can still be read.

Bishopric of Hexham

The first diocese of Lindisfarne was merged into the Diocese of York in 664. York diocese was then divided in 678 by Theodore of Tarsus, forming a bishopric for the country between the Rivers Aln and Tees, with a seat at Hexham and/or Lindisfarne. This gradually and erratically merged back into the bishopric of Lindisfarne. Eleven bishops of Hexham followed St. Eata, of which six were saints.

No successor was appointed in 821, the condition of the country being too unsettled. A period of disorder followed the Danish devastations, after which Hexham monastery was reconstituted in 1113 as a priory of Austin Canons, which flourished until its dissolution under Henry VIII. Meantime the bishopric had been merged in that of Lindisfarne, which latter see was removed to Chester-le-Street in 883, and thence to Durham in 995.

Bishops
Eata, 'bishop of Bernicia', with his seat at Hexham and/or Lindisfarne, died 685, succeeded by John of Beverley (Bede, Ecclesiastical History IV.12)
Trumbert, 682, as 'bishop of Hexham', at the same time as Trumwine's installation, with Eata continuing as bishop at Lindisfarne
Cuthbert of Lindisfarne, 685, after Trumbert's deposition, moving his seat to Lindisfarne to become bishop of Lindisfarne (Bede, IV.28)
St. John of Beverley (685–705) (Bede, V.2). From then on, the seat was at Hexham, and the bishopric of Lindisfarne continued independently, with Eadberht succeeding Cuthbert
St. Wilfrid, who, resigning the See of York, died as Bishop of Hexham in 709
St. Acca, Wilfrid's successor, from 709 (Bede, V.20)
Frithubeorht 734–766
St. Eahlmund 767–781
Tilbeorht 781–789
Æthelberht 789–797 transferred from Whithorn
Heardred 797–800
Eanbehrt 800–813
Tidfrith, last bishop in this line, who died about 821

Rectors
Canon Barker 1866–18[98?]
Edwin Sidney Savage 1898–1918
James Vaux Cornell Farquhar 1919–1945
Archibald George Hardie 1945–1962
Rowland Lemmon 1962–1975
Bishop Anthony Hunter 1975–1979
Timothy Withers Green 1979–1984
Michael Middleton 1985–1992
Canon Michael Nelson 1992–2004
Canon Graham Usher 2004–2014
Canon Dr Dagmar Winter 2015–2019
Rev'd David Glover 2020

Notable burials
Ælfwald I of Northumbria
Eata of Hexham
Frithubeorht
Acca of Hexham
Alchmund of Hexham
Henry Beaufort, 3rd Duke of Somerset
Thomas de Ros, 9th Baron de Ros
Robert Umfraville I (d. 1145)
Odinel Umfraville I
Gilbert de Umfraville
Gilbert de Umfraville, Earl of Angus
Matilda, Countess of Angus
Robert Ogle (MP)
Caleb Rotheram D.D. (1694–1752), dissenting minister and tutor

Tombstone of Flavinus, Roman standard-bearer

The tombstone of Flavinus is one of the most significant Roman finds in Britain. It can be found in the Abbey in front of a blocked doorway at the foot of the Night Stair. Flavinus was a Roman cavalry officer who died aged 25 in the first century. The slab is thought to have once stood near the fort of Coria near Corbridge and was brought here as a building stone in the 12th century. The slab was laid face-upward in the foundations of the cloister and was rediscovered in 1881.

Hexham Hoard 
In 1833 a hoard of approximately 8000 stycas were discovered whilst a grave was being dug in the Campey Hill area close to the north transept. The Hexham Hoard was concealed circa 850. It was composed of coins from the reigns of Eanred, Aethelred II and Redwulf, as well as coins of two archbishops Eanbald and Wigmund.

Organ

In 1865 the Abbey acquired a second-hand organ from Carlisle Cathedral dating from 1804. It was installed in Hexham by Nicholson of Newcastle and opened on 19 October 1865. In 1905 this was rebuilt by Norman and Beard with Sir Frederick Bridge of Westminster Abbey as the consultant.

In 1974 a new instrument by Lawrence Phelps of Pennsylvania was installed. It is a two manual 34-stop mechanical action instrument.

Organists
George Agnew Reay 1820–????
William Turner 1826-1865 1834–1855–1865
John Nicholson 1865–1878
James Price 1878–1882 (afterwards organist of St. Margaret's Church, Ipswich)
Thomas Simpson Camidge 1882–1889
Richard Seaton 1889–1909
Ronald Richardson Potter 1909–1911
Newell Smith Wallbank 1911–1917 (later organist of Wakefield Cathedral)
Harry William Tupper 1917–1918 (afterwards Organist of Southwell Minster)
Hubert Henry Norsworthy 1918
Newell Smith Wallbank 1918–1926 (later organist of Wakefield Cathedral)
Cecil S. Richards 1926
Reginald Tustin Baker 1928–1929 (later organist of Sheffield Cathedral)
Thomas Christy 1933–1945 (formerly sub-organist of Newcastle Cathedral 1928–1933)
Alfred Southcott Morrish 1945–1948
Frederick Hudson 1948–1949
Dr Reginald Cooper
Ronald Womersley
Terence Atkinson 1965–1985
John Green 1985–2000 (also Director of Music at Dame Allan's Schools, Newcastle, 1967–1990)
Michael Haynes 2000–2011
Marcus Wibberley 2011–2017
Michael Haynes 2017–

Assistant organists
Colin Basil Fanshaw 1947–1949
Dorothy Alder
John Green 1961–1968
Ron Lane 1969–1977
John Green 1977–1983
Henry Wallace 1983–1999
Hugh Morris 2001–2009 (currently director of the Royal School of Church Music)
Alexander Woodrow 2009–2012 (later director of music at Bradford Cathedral and currently Organist and Director of Music at Leeds Minster
Andrew Wyatt 2012–2015 (currently assistant organist at Truro Cathedral)
Michael Haynes 2015–2017 (formerly director of music 2000–2011, currently director of music 2017–)
Keith Dale 2017–

Choirs

Hexham Abbey Boys' Choir consists of boys' and men's voices and sings choral evensong on Wednesdays in addition to morning and evening services on the second and fourth Sundays of the month. The choir has made two CDs in recent years and has toured to Paris (2007), Rome (2009), Hanover (2011), Berlin (2012), Antwerp (2014) and Tallinn (2015), in addition to several tours within Great Britain. Several past members of the choir have gone on to win choral/organ scholarships at Oxford and Cambridge colleges. The choir has appeared on BBC Songs of Praise.

Hexham Abbey Girls' Choir consists of girls and men and sings for the Parish Eucharist & Choral Evensong on the third Sunday of the month. The girls also sing with the boys on the fourth Sunday of the month and girls' voices also sing evensong on Thursdays. The choir began in September 2001 and is divided into junior & senior choristers aging from 7–18. The choir has toured to Dublin (2007), Paris (2009), Hanover (2011), Berlin (2012) and several other places.

Hexham Abbey Chamber Choir is entirely made up of adults. They sing evensong on the first Sunday of the month and when the other Abbey Choirs are unavailable. It has appeared live on BBC Radio 4 Sunday Worship.

See also

Bishop of Hexham
List of English abbeys, priories and friaries serving as parish churches

References

External links

Hexham Abbey official web site
Read a detailed history about Hexham Priory
A Panoramic virtual tour of Hexham Abbey

7th-century church buildings in England
Anglo-Saxon monastic houses
Churches completed in 674
Religious buildings and structures completed in 1250
13th-century church buildings in England
Anglo-Saxon cathedrals
Former cathedrals in England
Benedictine monasteries in England
Augustinian monasteries in England
Hexham
Hexham
Monasteries in Northumberland
Tourist attractions in Northumberland
Christian monasteries established in the 7th century
7th-century establishments in England
1537 disestablishments in England
Hexham
Monasteries dissolved under the English Reformation